Lights and Sounds is the fifth studio album by American rock band Yellowcard, released on January 24, 2006, in the United States through Capitol Records. Lights and Sounds is Yellowcard's first concept album, which was inspired to reflect what the band was feeling at the time of production and how they have matured in the process. Lights and Sounds also departs from the sounds on Yellowcard's previous album, Ocean Avenue (2003), which broke away from its pop punk sound to a more alternative rock album.

Lights and Sounds debuted to mixed reviews from contemporary music critics, receiving criticism as the album fell short from the standard set by its predecessor, Ocean Avenue. Upon the album's release, it charted at number five on Billboard's 200 and Top Internet Albums' charts, making it the band highest charting album to date. The album accumulated sales of just over 315,000 copies, which failed to match the 2 million sales of their previous album. Yellowcard went on to explain that the disappointment of the sales were due to their going "a bit too far" with the expectations they had thought the album would exceed. Lights and Sounds was certified Gold by the Recording Industry Association of America (RIAA).

The album yielded two singles, "Lights and Sounds" and "Rough Landing, Holly". While the band was promoting the album, lead guitarist Ben Harper parted ways with the band. Following Harper's departure, the band revealed that they had entered their "highest and lowest" points because of Harper's departure from the band. To accommodate the album's promotion, Yellowcard replaced Harper with guitarist Ryan Mendez.

Background and production
After almost two years of touring in support of their 2003 album, Ocean Avenue, Yellowcard took a few months off. In December 2004, vocalist Ryan Key and bassist Peter Mosely moved to New York City to write songs for their upcoming album, while the rest of the band remained in Los Angeles.

As Key and Mosely stayed in New York, they admitted that there was a delay when it came to start writing songs for the album. Key, however, did explain that they were writing "weird, obscure, not-too-mellow" tracks and working on notebooks that he compiled while the band was touring. He also noted that he was able to write for a couple of hours and would receive over "15-20 ideas" that he could take out for the band, so once they all got together, they can start collaborating on the record. Mosely, also in discussion of this, added that the reason it took them so long was because they were "scared to death" with the writing. Mosely concluded that once the writing had begun, the process was easier on them. It was also during this time that Key and Mosely began to turn their apartment into a studio, adding a drum kit, guitar amps, and even including a piano. While Key and Mosely began the development of the songs, the rest of the members would occasionally fly to New York to check on the progress.

In April 2005, the band met in Los Angeles and began working at the Sunset Sound studios. The following month in an interview with MTV News, lead guitarist Ben Harper revealed that the writing process was finished. In addition, Harper commented that the band recorded 19 songs for the album, 13 of which made the final cut. Sessions were held at Sunset Sound in May and June 2005, with producer Neal Avron. Recording was handled by Bradley Cook and Avron, with assistance from Bill Mims and Pro Tools engineer Travis Huff. Tom Lord-Alge mixed the recordings, with assistance from Femio Hernández, at South Beach Studios in Miami, Florida. Ted Jensen mastered the album at Sterling Sound in New York City.

Music

Musical style
With Lights and Sounds, Yellowcard broke away from their original pop punk sound to a more alternative rock album. The album is somewhat of a concept album, made to reflect what Yellowcard was feeling at the time of production. Ryan Key, in discussion of this, said that Ocean Avenue was about "finding your place in the world" and explained that Lights and Sounds was about "realizing that you've gotten lost". The band has cited Radiohead's Kid A (2000) and Guns N' Roses' 1991 albums Use Your Illusion I and Use Your Illusion II as major influences for the album. Yellowcard also credit Aphex Twin, Mouse on Mars and Explosions in the Sky for inspiration, regarding the music sound in the album.

In an interview in August 2005, Key explained that the album was a "definite departure" and "more political" than what Ocean Avenue had contained. In discussion of the album, Key said that the band had matured and that the music in Lights and Sounds would be different from their previous album. Though, Key added, "...we have to be careful, we have to try and write songs [in the style of the ones] we wrote before. We have to make a conscious effort not to think about the fact that we went from being a nothing band ... to having a bunch of hit singles in like, one year." Printz Board of The Black Eyed Peas collaborated with Yellowcard on the song "Two Weeks from Twenty" where he played a trumpet solo. The song, "How I Go", features a duet with the Chicks' lead vocalist Natalie Maines, and features a twenty-five piece orchestra, which was conducted by violinist Sean Mackin. According to Peter Mosely, the band liked the Chicks' and even thought of collaborating with Maines on Ocean Avenue for the song "View from Heaven". Mosely also revealed that the band approached Maines about singing on "How I Go"; "The original plan was just for her to sing back-up (on the song). [But] it ended up turning into a duet." He also added that Maines took a demo of the song and returned to the studio, Sunset Sound, where the band were working, in addition to the Chicks working on their album, with lyrics and vocals of her own.

Mackin also composed an entire string section and conducted an orchestra in the album. In an interview with Daily Nexus in June 2006, Mackin revealed that the conducting was the easy part and that the composing part was much harder. In this interview, Mackin also commented, "composing was getting so frustrating since I wasn’t writing as fast as my mind was thinking, so going back I wanted to make sure that each of my arrangements for this album and the 12 different songs were completely different".

Lyrical content
Lights and Sounds primarily focuses on the band coping with the success they were enduring when writing songs for the album. The album also goes with what Key described as when he was preoccupied with making Lights and Sounds. Key said that one of the common themes that were written in the album was the band's hatred in living in Los Angeles. Key said that the songs have "lost that adolescent bounciness -- they've come into adulthood a bit". In an interview with Rolling Stone magazine, Key revealed that during the time he and Mosely spent in New York, he said it "brought out some darker places" in them and that it was "not in a 'now I'm going to start wearing eyeliner' kind of way, but emotionally darker." In addition, many of the song's themes deal with Key's battle with drugs and alcohol.

While making the album, Yellowcard had also developed a character, Holly Wood, who served as a narrator and protagonist for the album's storyline. The character is featured in the songs "Rough Landing, Holly" and "Holly Wood Died". The band explained the meaning of the title track, which they said is based on a "whirlwind rocker about the pressures on the band members" and how they have changed as they have aged after the release of Ocean Avenue. Key also commented that when he was preoccupied with making the album, there were distractions while in the process; he simply referred to the distractions as "lights and sounds", which ultimately resulted in the band naming the album just that. He also says that the main reason behind that was how it affected the band during that particular time.

During discussion of the track listing in Lights and Sounds, Yellowcard revealed that "Two Weeks from Twenty" stretched the "limits" for them and explained that it was a "jazz-lounge anti-war song". The band also explained that the song is a narrative of a young soldier named Jimmy, from New Jersey, who is killed in the Iraq war. Other songs such as "Down on My Head", "City of Devils", and "Holly Wood Died", had a theme that spoke about bitterness and disillusionment. "How I Go" is based on both lament of a father over the life that has flowed past him and the 2003 film, Big Fish. Another song, "Words, Hands, Hearts", is written about the events that occurred during the September 11 attacks.

Release and promotion

In August 2005, Yellowcard announced the songs, "Lights and Sounds", "Sure Thing Falling", and "Two Weeks from Twenty", that were going to be featured in the album. In September 2005, the band played a few festivals in Japan, before embarking on a tour of Canada with Rufio and Moneen. That same month, their next album was announced for release in four months' time. "Lights and Sounds" debuted as part of the soundtrack to Burnout Revenge, before made available for streaming through the band's website on September 14, 2005. Later in September, the band announced the album's title and revealed that the title track, "Lights and Sounds", was confirmed to be the first single from the album, with a video shot in Van Nuys, California and a release date of November 15.

Between October and December 2005, Yellowcard went on a cross-country US tour with Acceptance and the Pink Spiders. In November 2005, it was announced that guitarist Ben Harper had parted ways with the band. Key explained that the band went through "a lot of the highest and lowest points" and that making an album "would be on the highest list, and losing a member would be on the lowest." He also added, "It's really been a long journey together, you know, so obviously, parting ways with Ben was a really unpleasant experience. It was either go on without him, or don't go on at all. And, at the core, we decided that we had something too great to let go of, and that we had to kind of make a last resort and move on without him." Harper was replaced by Ryan Mendez of Staring Back, who broke up upon Mendez leaving.

The music video for the title-track was featured on a Verizon Wireless Vcast commercial around the time of the album's release. Lights and Sounds was released on January 24, 2006 through major label Capitol Records. In January and February the band went on a tour of the US. On March 21, 2006, the music video for "Rough Landing, Holly" was posted online. In April and May, the band embarked on the Virgin College Mega Tour alongside Mae, Over It, and Strike Fire Fall. Following this, they appeared at the HFStival. In June, the band went on a summer tour alongside Matchbook Romance and Hedley. During this, a video for "Sure Thing Falling" was posted on the band's Myspace profile. They then appeared at the San Diego Street Scene festival in August 2006, and played a few shows in Brazil. In September 2006, the band went on a headlining tour of the US with support from Anberlin and Reeve Oliver, and appeared at the X96 Big Ass Show and Bamboozle Left festivals.

Critical reception

The reviews for Lights and Sounds were mostly mixed upon release, particularly from mainstream media, but some critics have stated that the album had fallen well short of the standards of Ocean Avenue, the album's predecessor. Kelefa Sanneh of the New York Times, in review of the album, wrote: "To listeners on either side of rock's latest generational divide, there's a big difference -- the difference of a decade -- between being a loser and being a twerp ... Lights and Sounds is Yellowcard's attempt to split that difference." Sanneh reports that the song "Two Weeks from Twenty", one of the band's anti-war song, "sounds suspiciously like Green Day; the lyrics echo the plot of the video for Green Day's 'Wake Me Up When September Ends'." Despite this, Sanneh goes on to say that Yellowcard is still "pretty good" at "writing sweeping, upbeat punk-rock love songs". Ben Breier of Kent News wrote: "One thing is certain: The Yellowcard you grew to know and love circa Ocean Avenue is no longer with us. The band has vastly matured when compared to past records, but it comes at a price – members forgot what made them occasionally catchy and addictive in the first place. It's clearly the right direction for the band, but Yellowcard needs to further refine its new style before it can come up with something above average." Mike Schiller of PopMatters, who was somewhat displeased with the album, wrote that the album does not "make up for the overabundance of flaccid mediocrity on display throughout most of the album". Schiller went on to say, "Lights and Sounds may be Yellowcard’s attempt at a big, serious album, but the band doesn’t sound even remotely ready." Nick Cowen from Drowned in Sound wrote: "Those who register for Pop-Punk 101 will receive Yellowcard’s Lights And Sounds as their first set-work; the Jacksonville quintet's new album would be the perfect teaching aid, as it's technically proficient while being boring and forgettable enough not to inspire the temptation to plagiarise." Cowen concluded that the album "is a substandard, second-tier album with some strings thrown in for good measure. It's really not worth the money in your wallet – even if that wallet is attached to a very long chain." Now magazine claimed that the band "may be in the right place, it's clear they're simply incapable of realizing this clumsy faux magnum opus."

Despite the mixed reaction, many critics were fond of the album. Rolling Stone's music critic Jenny Eliscu wrote that the album "has made what ends up being one of the best straight-up pop-rock albums of 2006". Elicsu also complimented the band, writing: "Like the Goo Goo Dolls ... Yellowcard have rightfully recognized the transcendent value of a big, fist-pumping anthem coated with a light dose of romantic schmaltz." Alternative Press gave the album a perfect rating, saying, "It may be one of the least 'punk' albums a pop-punk band will make this year--but it's probably one of the best, too." Sputnikmusic gave the album 3.5 out of five stars, writing: "It's pop-punk, and fairly unambitious stuff at that ... What keeps this record on its feet is the lyricism, the production and the simplicity of it all." Heather Phares of AllMusic wrote: "On Lights and Sounds, Yellowcard sounds light years away from its One for the Kids/Where We Stand days. Granted, the band still trades in the immediate melodies and heart-on-sleeve lyrics that they've used since the beginning, but major-label success suits them well." Though, Phares went on to add that the band "ends up sounding self-assured instead of compromised in its big-budget surroundings." Billboard magazine gave the album 8 out of 10 stars, and claimed that Yellowcard made a "strong effort that trades sunny-sounding rockers and breakup songs for weightier concerns of war and family, 'Lights' conveys that maturity without seeming strained." Dan McClanahan of Iowa State Daily wrote: "...This disc will likely change people's opinion of Yellowcard. Much more angst and a drastically matured sound make for a pleasant surprise." McClanahan revealed that he was not looking forward to listen to the album, but admitted once he heard he knew it embraced the band's "strengths" and that they "greatly expanded the subject matter of its songs."

Commercial performance

Lights and Sounds debuted at number five on the Billboard 200 and Top Internet Albums' charts, and sold over 95,000 copies in its first week of release. Since June 2006, Lights and Sounds has sold over 315,000 copies in the United States. The album did not exceed the expectations of Ocean Avenue, which approached 2 million in record sales. Internationally, Lights and Sounds peaked at number four on the Canadian Top Album Chart, making it Yellowcard's highest debut in Canada. It also debuted at number six in the Australian chart, in which it spent six weeks, before retiring in the number 49 position. In the New Zealand chart it peaked in the number 11 position. Lights and Sounds charted on the number 59 spot in the United Kingdom and spent one week on the chart. In the United States, the album was certified gold by the RIAA on March 15, 2006, indicating shipment of 500,000.

When asked about the disappointment of sales that Lights and Sounds received, Sean Mackin said:
I think that the band went on ... maybe not a tangent, but we had a goal in mind, and at the end of the recording process, we were so proud of how artistic we were. And I think we showed too much. I think maybe we were a little too jaded and a little too dark, and I think that the lack of hope and faith that we put on this record made us a little less sparkly and light to people. But I think that it's all part of our evolution. We all went a bit too far.

Mackin also insisted that the band did not see the album as a mistake, but more of a "learning experience", so that it would not happen again whey they work on their next project.

Two singles were released from Lights and Sounds. The first, "Lights and Sounds", the title track, was released on November 25, 2005. The song peaked at number four on Billboard's Hot Modern Rock Tracks chart. The song also appeared on the Hot Digital Songs chart on the number 26 position. It also charted in Billboard's Hot 100 and Pop 100, respectively. The second single, "Rough Landing, Holly", was released on May 6, 2006, reached 27 on Billboard's Hot Modern Rock Tracks, and peaked at number 49 on the Australian Recording Industry Association (ARIA) chart.

Track listing
All lyrics by Ryan Key, except where noted. All music by Key, Sean Mackin, Ryan Mendez, Pete Mosely, and Longineu W. Parsons III, except where noted.

Personnel
Personnel per booklet.

Yellowcard
 Ryan Key – lead vocals, guitars
 Sean Mackin – violin, background vocals, string arranger
 Ben Harper – guitars (tracks 3–5, 8, 10–12 and 14), dobro (track 5)
 Peter Mosely – bass, keyboards, background vocals, string arranger (track 8)
 Longineu W. Parsons III – drums

Production and design
 Neal Avron – producer, recording
 Bradley Cook – recording
 Bill Mims – assistant
 Travis Huff – Pro Tools engineer
 Tom Lord-Alge – mixing
 Femio Hernández – mix assistant
 Ted Jensen – mastering
 Chris Bilheimer – art direction, photography
 Max Vadukul – band photograph

Additional musicians
 Printz Board – trumpet (track 7)
 Natalie Maines – additional vocals (track 13)
 Christine Choi – string arrangement (track 13)
 Rodney Wirtz – string arrangement (track 13)
 Mark Robertson – violin
 Liane Mautner – violin
 Tritia Lee – violin
 Sam Fischer – violin
 Michaela Keating – violin
 Alyssa Park – violin
 Grace Oh – violin
 Paul Henning – violin
 Rodney Wirtz – viola
 Jerome Gordon – viola
 Brett Banducci – viola
 Christine Choi – cello
 Victor Lawrence – cello
 Paul Wiancko – cello
 Nick France – bass
 Cathy Cho – flute
 Amy Tatum – flute
 Don Foster – clarinet
 Teag Reves – horns
 Danielle Ondarza – horns
 Dave Costello – trumpet
 Nick Stoup – percussion

Charts

Album

Singles

Certifications

Notes and references
Footnotes

Citations

External links

Lights and Sounds at YouTube (streamed copy where licensed)
 Interview at RoomThirteen

2006 albums
Yellowcard albums
Capitol Records albums
Concept albums
Albums produced by Neal Avron
Albums recorded at Sunset Sound Recorders